Chris Butler (born 1 January 1974) is an English animator, writer and director, known for his works at Laika, such as ParaNorman and Missing Link, which were both nominated for the Academy Award for Best Animated Feature.

He studied animation at the University for the Creative Arts in south England and is an alumnus of Hugh Baird College in Merseyside.

Filmography

Character designer
 The Tigger Movie (2000) (Also sequence co-director)
 Missing Link (2019)

Storyboard artist
 Mr. Bean: The Animated Series (2002-2004) (10 episodes)
 Tarzan 2 (2005)
 Corpse Bride (2005)
 The Tale of Despereaux (2008) (Uncredited)
 Coraline (2009) (Storyboard supervisor)

References

External links

1974 births
21st-century English LGBT people
Living people
British animated film directors
Animation screenwriters
English designers
English screenwriters
English male screenwriters
English film directors
British gay artists
British gay writers
Laika (company) people
Radio presenters from Liverpool
English expatriates in the United States
British storyboard artists
LGBT animators
LGBT film directors
British LGBT screenwriters
English LGBT writers